The Perth metropolitan region or the Perth metropolitan area is the administrative area and geographical extent of the Western Australian capital city of Perth and its conurbation.

It generally includes the coastal strip from Two Rocks in the north to Singleton in the south, and inland to The Lakes in the east, but its extent can be defined in a number of ways:

The metropolitan region is defined by the Planning and Development Act 2005 to include 30 local government areas with the outer extent being the City of Wanneroo and the City of Swan to the north, the Shire of Mundaring, City of Kalamunda, and the City of Armadale to the east, the Shire of Serpentine-Jarrahdale to the southeast and the City of Rockingham to the southwest, and including the islands of Rottnest Island and Garden Island off the west coast. This extent correlates with the Metropolitan Region Scheme.
The Australian Bureau of Statistics' Perth (Major Statistical Division) accords with the Metropolitan Region Scheme area.
The Regional Development Commissions Act 1993 includes the Shire of Serpentine-Jarrahdale in the Peel region instead.
The Australian Bureau of Statistics Greater Capital City Statistical Area, or Greater Perth in short, consists of the area defined by the Metropolitan Region Scheme, plus the City of Mandurah and the Pinjarra Level 2 Statistical Area of the Shire of Murray.

The Perth metropolitan region is grouped with the Peel region in some urban planning documents including the Western Australian Planning Commission's Directions 2031 and Beyond and the Perth and Peel@3.5 million suite of documents. Together, the Perth and Peel regions stretch  from Two Rocks in the north to Herron in the south and are currently home to more than two million people.

Subregions and local government areas 

According to the Metropolitan Region Scheme, the Perth metropolitan region comprises the following 5 subregions and 30 local government areas (20 cities, 3 shires, and 7 towns):

Inner Metro Area (19 LGAs) 
Cities (11)
 City of Bayswater
 City of Belmont
 City of Canning
 City of Fremantle
 City of Melville
 City of Nedlands
 City of Perth
 City of South Perth
 City of Stirling
 City of Subiaco
 City of Vincent

Shire (1)
 Shire of Peppermint Grove

Towns (7)
 Town of Bassendean
 Town of Cambridge
 Town of Claremont
 Town of Cottesloe
 Town of East Fremantle
 Town of Mosman Park
 Town of Victoria Park

North-eastern Outer Metro Area (3 LGAs) 
Cities (2)
 City of Kalamunda
 City of Swan

Shire (1)
 Shire of Mundaring

North-western Outer Metro Area (2 LGAs) 
Cities (2)
 City of Joondalup
 City of Wanneroo

South-eastern Outer Metro Area (3 LGAs) 
Cities (2)
 City of Armadale
 City of Gosnells

Shire (1)
 Shire of Serpentine-Jarrahdale

South-western Outer Metro Area (3 LGAs) 
Cities (3)
 City of Cockburn
 City of Kwinana
 City of Rockingham

Livability 
According to a 2019 report from the Ipsos Life in Australia project, Perth's Inner Metro Area was rated the most livable metropolitan area in Australia.

See also 
 1955 Plan for the Metropolitan Region, Perth and Fremantle
 List of islands of Perth, Western Australia
 List of Perth suburbs
 Western Australian Planning Commission

Notes

References

External links
 Metropolitan Region Scheme – The Department of Planning, Lands and Heritage
 Metropolitan Perth LGA boundaries – The Department of Primary Industries and Regional Development

Perth, Western Australia
Regions of Western Australia